Firuzan (also Romanized as Fīrūzān) is a city and capital of Khezel District, in Nahavand County, Hamadan Province, Iran. At the 2006 census, its population was 4,054, in 1,069 families.

References

Populated places in Nahavand County

Cities in Hamadan Province